The Essex Rebels are a basketball club from Colchester, Essex. The Rebels' women's team compete in the WBBL, the top-level women's basketball league in Great Britain. After competing in the NBL as the Essex Blades, the Rebels moved into the professional ranks of the WBBL at the start of the 2018-19 season.

Women's team

The Rebels are coached by Tom Sadler, who has been coaching the team since November 2018 and is now in a permanent position of Head of Basketball Performance for the University.

Current roster

Season-by-season records

Men's team

Current roster

Season-by-season records

References

External links 

Women's British Basketball League teams
Sport in Colchester
Women's basketball teams in England
2014 establishments in England
Basketball teams established in 2014